Millennium Scholastic School & College is an English-medium educational institution of North Bengal. It is situated in Jahangirabad Cantonment in Bogra, Bangladesh.  The school was established in 1998.

The institution has been claimed to have "largest English Version School & College premises in the northern region of the country".

Curriculum
From Nursery up to Standard V the school will follow English Medium School Curriculum as directed by AHQ (Army Headquarters). Subsequent classes will follow National Curriculum designed by NCTB in English leading to Primary School Certificate (PSC), Junior School Certificate (JSC), Secondary School Certificate (SSC) and Higher Secondary (School) Certificate (HSC) exams after classes V, VIII, X and XII respectively.

Classes
  Nursery - 4 to 5 years
  KG - 5 to 6 years
  Class I - 6 to 7 years
  Class II - 7 to 8 years
  Class III - 8 to 9 years
  Class IV - 9 to 10 years
  Class V - 10 to 11 years
  Class VI - 11 to 12 years
  Class VII - 12 to 13 years
  Class VIII - 13 to 14 years
  Class IX - 14 to 15 years
  Class X - 15 to 16 years
  Class XI - 16 to 17 years
  Class XII - 17 to 18 years

Co-curricular activities (CCA)
These include:
 Debate competition
 Set Speech competition
 Extemporaneous speaking
 Quiz/general knowledge competition
 Art competition
 Recitation competition
 Qira'at competition
 Science fair
 Annual sports
 Cultural function
 Annual picnic
 Annual Excursion
 Annual Millennium Night
 Inter house annual football tournament
 Inter house annual basketball tournament
 Inter house annual cricket tournament
 Dance competition
 Music competition

See also
 List of schools in Bangladesh
 Education in Bangladesh

References 
Millennium Scholastic School And College-student's corner (Facebook page)

External links 
 Official Facebook page of the school
 Official website

Schools in Bogra District
Education in Bangladesh
Educational Institutions affiliated with Bangladesh Army